A guitar pedalboard  is a flat board or panel that serves as a container, patch bay, and power supply for effects pedals for the electric guitar. Some pedalboards contain their own transformer and power cables to power multiple pedals. Pedalboards help the player manage multiple pedals.  The entire pedalboard can be packed up and transported to the next location without disassembly.

Pedalboards often have a cover that protects the effects pedals during transportation. There are many varieties of pedalboard cases, including homemade do it yourself pedalboard cases, store-bought pedalboard cases, and custom-made pedalboard cases. Hard shell pedalboard-cases have foam padding, reinforced corners, and locking latches. During performance, with the lid removed, the bottom of the case is a pedalboard. Most pedalboards have a flat surface where pedals and their power supplies attach using hook-and-loop fasteners or other techniques, and often have a removable lid or padding to protect the pedals when not in use. Some pedalboards have handles or wheels to facilitate transportation.

Pedal power supply
Most effects pedals are powered by varying levels of DC voltage, depending on the manufacturer. Possible voltages include 9V, 12V, 15V, 18V, 24V, and 40V, though 9V is most common.  Some effects pedals accept a range of voltages, producing different effects. Guitar players can experiment with varying voltages to generate different sounds.

DC power can be generated by batteries, an AC/DC power supply, or a rechargeable battery. Each has its own advantages and disadvantages.  Using individual batteries is fine for occasional players, because they don't have to worry about the cost of replacement batteries or changes in sound as batteries get tired. Battery life varies depending on the pedal's power draw. Professional players normally replace all batteries with new ones before a show.

A DC power supply is a good alternative, though the initial cost is higher. However, one must pay attention to ground loops and power line hum. Noise gates can help to reduce the noise by suppressing the signal below a certain volume threshold, but this only controls unwanted noise without actually removing it from the signal.

The third approach is to use a powerful rechargeable battery to drive all the pedals, and a battery charger to recharge the battery. This eliminates ground loops because the pedals are grounded at a single point: the amplifier. There are batteries on the market that can power over 20 effects pedals for eight hours on a single charge. The effects pedals are connected to the rechargeable battery via isolated DC-DC converters, which produce the required voltages.

Using a rechargeable effects pedal battery or AC/DC power supply  in conjunction with a “pedalboard suitcase” reduces setup time prior to a show.

See also
Pete Cornish
Effects unit
Guitar amplifier
Distortion (guitar)
Electric guitar

References

External links
"Chairmen of the Boards". Guitar Player. May 1, 2008.
"5 Tips for Better Tone Live"
"Guitar Pedal Guides"

Amplified instruments
Effects units